Pountney Hill House is a Grade II listed building on Laurence Pountney Hill, in the City of London, U.K. It was built in the late 19th century. In 2015, a window cleaner fell to his death while cleaning a window in the building.

References

Grade II listed buildings in the City of London
Buildings and structures completed in the 19th century